John Hurst (born November 2, 1996) is an American football wide receiver who is a free agent. He played college football at West Georgia.

Early life and high school
Hurst grew up in Milton, Georgia and attended Cambridge High School. As a senior, he caught 63 passes for 834 yards and seven touchdowns and was named All-North Fulton.

College career
Hurst was a member of the West Georgia Wolves for five seasons, redshirting as a true freshman. He caught 40 passes for 654 yards and seven touchdowns and was named first-team All-Gulf South Conference as a senior. Hurst finished his collegiate career with 77 receptions for 1,242 yards and 12 touchdowns in 35 games played and was named to West Georgia's All-Decade Team for the 2010s. After his senior season, Hurst declared for the 2020 NFL Draft, where he went undrafted.

Professional career

Tampa Bay Buccaneers
Hurst was signed by the Tampa Bay Buccaneers as undrafted free agent on May 4, 2020, and made the team out of training camp. He was placed on injured reserve on September 7, 2020. Hurst was activated off the injured reserve on October 19, 2020, subsequently waived the next day, and signed to the practice squad on October 22. He was released on November 5.

Los Angeles Chargers
On November 16, 2020, Hurst signed with the practice squad of the Los Angeles Chargers. He signed a reserve/future contract with the Chargers on January 5, 2021. He was waived on August 30, 2021.

Tampa Bay Buccaneers (second stint)
On September 21, 2021, Hurst signed with the Buccaneers' practice squad. He was released on November 10. He was re-signed on November 24. He was released on December 14. He was re-signed on January 11, 2022.

Indianapolis Colts
On July 26, 2022, Hurst signed with the Indianapolis Colts. On August 2, 2022, Hurst was placed on injured reserve. He was waived/injured on August 9, 2022.

References

External links
West Georgia Wolves bio
Los Angeles Chargers bio

1996 births
Living people
American football wide receivers
West Georgia Wolves football players
Players of American football from Georgia (U.S. state)
Sportspeople from Fulton County, Georgia
Tampa Bay Buccaneers players
Los Angeles Chargers players
Indianapolis Colts players